Union Sportive Ouvrière Mondeville Basket is a French women's basketball club from Mondeville playing in the Ligue Féminine de Basketball.

Founded in 1971, Mondeville won the national cup in 1995 and 1999. It has played the Euroleague in 2006, 2007, 2008 and 2011, reaching the Round of 16 in its two first appearances. It has also played the Ronchetti Cup and the Eurocup, reaching the quarterfinals in four occasions.

Titles
 French Cup
 1995, 1999

2011-12 Squad
 (1.92)  Giedre Paugaite
 (1.91)  Naignouma Coulibaly
 (1.91)  Egle Sulciute
 (1.87)  Laetitita Kamba
 (1.86)  Hhadydia Minte
 (1.84)  Anna Vida
 (1.78)  Kateřina Zohnová
 (1.75)  Kristen B. Sharp
 (1.69)  Touty Gandega
 (1.64)  Ingrid Tanqueray

References

Mondeville
Mondeville
Basketball teams established in 1971